Ashbridges Bay is a bay and park in Toronto, Ontario, Canada. It is located along Lake Shore Boulevard next to Woodbine Beach in the Beaches. The Martin Goodman Trail and  boardwalk run through the park along the bay. The boardwalk runs  from Ashbridges Bay in the west to the R. C. Harris Water Treatment Plant in the east along Lake Ontario.  It was once part of the marsh that lay east of Toronto Islands and Toronto Harbour.

History
The bay is named for Sarah Ashbridge, a British loyalist from Philadelphia whose family once lived nearby on a farm. It was once a five square kilometre marsh on the Don River delta and one of the largest wetlands in Eastern Canada.

A breakwall formed on the western end with an outlet into Toronto Bay.

Before the 1900, the bay was used to obtain ice during the winter months and stopped after the bay became polluted to the point the water became unsafe:

 Samuel Hill's Ice House at Leslie Street and Eastern Avenue
 Graham's Ice House at Lake (now Knox) and Eastern Avenue
 Martin McKee's Ice House at foot of Carlaw Avenue at (now infill area near Lake Shore Boulevard)

   
Due to industrial development and sewage disposal into the marsh, in 1910 a Toronto Board of Trade proposal for Ashbridges Bay was for an industrial district for industrial offices and sites served by railway lines, public warehouses alongside docking facilities south of Keating Channel to the Eastern Gap and a parkland/recreational strip at the south end. In 1912, the Toronto Harbour Commission drained it and reclaimed the land. The Ashbridges Bay Reclamation Scheme was the largest engineering project in North America at that time, filling in an area from Cherry Street to Leslie Street to create the Port Lands Industrial District and building the Ashbridges Bay Wastewater Treatment Plant. When it was completed in the 1920s, only a fragment of the original Ashbridges Bay remained, and the mouth of the Don River had been dramatically altered, instead flowing through the Keating Channel. The bay's size was shrunk to the area between the Port Lands and Woodbine Beach.

Ashbridges Bay Park opened in 1977. In the early 2000s the park was improved by Waterfront Toronto, including the building of a skateboard park. The current bay is surrounded by marinas, the treatment plant and a small tree lined section along Lake Shore Boulevard East such that the original natural shoreline has disappeared completely. Ashbridges Bay is also a popular location for fireworks on Canada Day and Victoria Day.

References

Parks in Toronto
Bays of Ontario
Redeveloped ports and waterfronts in Toronto